The Semovente da 90/53 was a heavy Italian self-propelled gun and tank destroyer, used by the Italian and German Armies during World War II.

Development
The Semovente da 90/53 was created by mounting a 90 mm Cannone da 90/53 anti-aircraft gun on top of an enlarged chassis of a M14/41 tank. Only 30 of these vehicles were produced, all in 1942. This low production was due to Italy's limited industrial capability at the time, as well as high demand for the 90 mm gun for regular anti-aircraft duties.

The Semovente da 90/53 was primarily developed in response to demands by Italian forces on the Eastern Front for a vehicle-mounted anti-tank weapon that could take on Soviet T-34 and KV tanks. Italian armoured forces on the Eastern Front were equipped only with the L6/40 tank and Semovente 47/32 self-propelled gun; neither of these had the firepower to cope with the Soviet medium and heavy tanks. However, no Semovente da 90/53 were ever sent to the Eastern Front.

The major drawback of the Semovente da 90/53, as with many self-propelled gun types of World War II, was the open top and rear of the gun compartment, which left the gun crew exposed to shrapnel and small arms fire. In addition, the Semovente da 90/53 had little or no armour in most areas. Because these vehicles were designed to operate far enough away from enemy vehicles to not be subject to incoming fire, this was initially not considered a problem. The small ammunition capacity of the vehicle—eight rounds—was also a problem, necessitating the creation of special ammunition carriers out of Fiat L6/40 tanks, one accompanying each Semovente da 90/53 in the field. The L6 ammunition carrier carried 26 rounds, plus an additional 40 rounds in a towed trailer. Beside the standard Armour Penetrating rounds, it could fire Effetto Pronto, or HEAT rounds, which shaped charge could pierce 200mm armour plating at any range.

Combat use
None were ever sent to the Eastern Front. In the North African Campaign, the Semovente da 90/53 proved to be an effective weapon and its long range was well suited to the flat and open desert terrain. 24 Semovente 90/53s saw service against the Allies in the 10° Raggruppamento Semoventi, which was stationed in Sicily during the Allied invasion in 1943. Following the Armistice of Cassibile in September 1943, the few surviving Semoventi da 90/53 were seized by the German Army, but were of little value in the mountainous terrain of Northern Italy where they operated. As a result, most finished their careers as long-range artillery.

Surviving vehicle
Only one Semovente da 90/53 survived the war. Originally displayed at Aberdeen Proving Grounds (APG), as shown in the sidebar photo above, it was transferred the Fort Sill Field Artillery Museum in Fort Sill, Oklahoma in 2012. It has since been restored by the Fort Sill Directorate of Logistics (DoL) paint shop and is awaiting display. This surviving example has, "A fairly good history. It was assigned to the 163rd Support Artillery Group, was captured in Sicily in 1943 and shipped back to Aberdeen for evaluation."

References

Sources

External links
Semovente da 90/53 at wwiivehicles.com
WWII U.S. Report on Semovente 90/53, June 1943

Armoured fighting vehicles of Italy
World War II armoured fighting vehicles of Italy
World War II self-propelled artillery
World War II tank destroyers
90 mm artillery
Military vehicles introduced from 1940 to 1944